is a Japanese alpine skier. He competed in two events at the 1980 Winter Olympics.

References

1958 births
Living people
Japanese male alpine skiers
Olympic alpine skiers of Japan
Alpine skiers at the 1980 Winter Olympics
Sportspeople from Aomori Prefecture
20th-century Japanese people